A red carpet is a red strip of carpet placed on the ground for VIPs to walk on when entering or leaving a building or vehicle.

Red carpet may also refer to:
 Red Carpet (software), a Linux software management tool
 Red Carpet (band), a Belgian house/electronica production act
 Red Carpet, Calgary, Canada
 Red Carpet (film), a 2014 film
 "Red Carpet", a 2015 song by Namie Amuro
 A part of the storyline in the Greek tragedy Agamemnon, from the trilogy the Oresteia, by Aeschylus (458 BC)
 Red Carpet Club, former name of United Airlines airport lounges
 Echis pyramidum aliaborri, a viper species known as the red carpet viper
 Xanthorhoe decoloraria, a moth species known as the red carpet